Horacio Rodríguez Larreta (born 29 October 1965) is an Argentine economist, politician and the current Chief of Government of the City of Buenos Aires.

Larreta was re-elected in 2019 with almost 56% of the votes, becoming the first candidate to win a mayoral election in the first round since the adoption of Buenos Aires's autonomous constitution. He won in every comuna, except Comuna 4 and Comuna 8.

Since 2019, he assumed the leadership of the Argentine opposition, Juntos por el Cambio. On February 2023, he announced his candidacy for the presidency in the 2023 general election.

Early life and education
Larreta was born in Buenos Aires on 29 October 1965. On his father's side, Rodríguez Larreta is of Basque descent; his ancestors were a wealthy landowning family from Gipuzkoa. His father, Horacio Rodríguez Larreta (1934–2004) was a prominent member of the Integration and Development Movement and chairman of Racing Club, while his great-uncle, the namesake Horacio Rodríguez Larreta (1871–1935) was Attorney General of Argentina during the presidency of Marcelo Torcuato de Alvear.

Rodríguez Larreta is also descended from the Leloir family, a wealthy family of French Argentines who once owned the lands that are now Parque Leloir, in Ituzaingó, Buenos Aires, and the Unzué family (through Mariano Unzué), former owners of the now-demolished Palacio Unzué.

He finished high school at the Escuela Argentina Modelo, and graduated with a degree in economics at the University of Buenos Aires in 1988 and obtained a Master in Business Administration in Harvard Business School. He returned to Argentina in 1993.

Early political career
Rodríguez Larreta's political career began in the Justicialist Party. In 1995, during the presidency of Carlos Menem, he was appointed director of the National Social Security Administration. In 1998 he moved to the Ministry of Social Development. He led the Comprehensive Medical Attention Program in 2000, during the presidency of Fernando de la Rúa. Rodríguez Larreta's administration is credited with improving the financial structure of the organization by imposing budget cuts.

Republican Proposal
He helped Mauricio Macri to create the political party Commitment to Change, which would eventually become the Republican Proposal (PRO). Macri became Mayor of Buenos Aires and Larreta served as Chief of the Cabinet of Ministers for eight years.

Larreta and Gabriela Michetti ran against each other in the primary elections of PRO Union, a center-right coalition in 2015, with Larreta ultimately winning the party's support for mayorship of Buenos Aires.
 On 5 July 2015, Larreta won 45% of the vote, forcing a runoff with the leader of center-left Evolution's, Martín Lousteau, who secured 28% of the vote.

Rodríguez Larreta won the ballottage by three points over Lousteau and succeeded Mauricio Macri as Mayor of the City since 2015.

In these elections, PRO was stronger in wealthier northern Buenos Aires, while ECO was stronger in the southern, poorer neighborhoods of the city.

Chief of Government of Buenos Aires

Mauricio Macri was elected President of Argentina in 2015, and Larreta was elected Mayor of Buenos Aires, both for the PRO party.

Security
Macri transferred a part of the Argentine Federal Police to Buenos Aires, as it had been requested by the city many years before. With the police under his control, Larreta went on to remove the manteros (streetwalk vendors) from the Caballito and Once neighborhoods.

In 2017, Larreta formed the Buenos Aires City Police, merging officers from the Federal and Metropolitan police forces.

Public work

During its management, the work of the Paseo del Bajo was started and inaugurated, which is the 7.1-kilometer road corridor that will connect the Illia and Buenos Aires-La Plata highways, the work in question began during January 2017 and the 27 May 2019 shortening the journey from 50 minutes to 10 minutes. It will generate 100,000 square meters of public and green space and improve the circulation of 134,000 daily passengers.

He also inaugurated the work of the Mitre Viaduct, which will raise the Mitre line of the metropolitan train over its current course, enabling new level crossings and eliminating traditional barriers. It is 3.9 km inside the city. The objective of this work is to eliminate the level crossings of the streets Monroe, Blanco Encalada, Mendoza, Juramento, Olazábal, Sucre, La Pampa and Olleros. In addition, 4 safe crossings will be opened on streets that were closed to traffic: Roosevelt, Echeverría and Virrey del Pino, for vehicular traffic, and José Hernández, an exclusive pedestrian crossing.

In 2018, Larreta's government inaugurated a new station on Line H serving the University of Buenos Aires Faculty of Law in the Recoleta neighborhood. In mid-2019, the three new stations of the extension of Line E (Correo Central, Catalinas and Retiro), were inaugurated.
After 45 years of sustained Subway growth, new subway stations construction was halted in 2018 by his administration 

During its first term, 3 viaducts were built, 9 km of underground work of the Vega Stream, 7 stations of subway, 10,000 security cameras, 62.5 km of metrobus extension, 54 new schools, 10,000 new homes, 7 monitoring centers, 46 health centers, the Olympic District was built, the San Martin Theater was reopened, the Corrientes Street, the Youth Olympic Games were held in 2018, neighborhoods were integrated and urbanized and the City became 100% led

Also, he broke a world record selling 267 hectares of Public Lands without consulting their citizens, same as selling 126 "Plazas de Mayo" (May Park) .

Reelection
Larreta was re-elected in 2019 with almost 56% of the votes, becoming the first candidate to win a mayoral election in the first round since the adoption of Buenos Aires's autonomous constitution. He won in every comuna, except Comuna 4 and Comuna 8.

Cabinet

Rodríguez Larreta announced his cabinet on 3 December, a week before taking office. It is composed of:
 Felipe Miguel, chief of cabinet of ministers
 Fernando Straface, general secretary
 Soledad Acuña, minister of education
 Ana María Bou Pérez, minister of health
 Guadalupe Tagliaferri, minister of urban development
 Leticia Montiel, legal and technical secretary
 Andrés Freire, minister of modernization
 Darío Lopérfido, minister of culture
 Martín Ocampo, minister of justice
 Eduardo Macchiavelli, minister of public space
 Franco Moccia, minister of transport
 Martín Mura, minister of finances
 Bruno Screnci, minister of government
 Marcelo Nachón, secretary of media

Personal life
Rodríguez Larreta is married to Bárbara Diez, a wedding planner, since 2001. He and Diez have two daughters, Paloma (born 2003) and Serena (born 2016), while Diez has an older daughter, Manuela, from an earlier marriage. Rodríguez Larreta and Diez have been separated since 2020. In October 2022, he made public his relationship with Milagros Maylin, a public officer in the Buenos Aires City Government and a friend of his daughter's, 20 years his junior.

Rodríguez Larreta is a Roman Catholic. He has stated his personal opposition to the legalization of abortion in Argentina.

Rodríguez Larreta suffers from essential tremor (ET).

Electoral history

Publications
 1996: Tecnología y competitividad en el Mercosur
 1997: Hacia un nuevo sector público
 1998: Domando al elefante blanco
 1999: El desafío de la igualdad
 2004: La reconstrucción del Estado
 2005: Cómo superar el default social
 2006: El país que queremos

References

External links

 Official site 
 Biography by CIDOB 

Mayors of Buenos Aires
1965 births
Living people
Argentine people of Basque descent
Argentine people of French descent
Republican Proposal politicians
Justicialist Party politicians
University of Buenos Aires alumni
Politicians from Buenos Aires
People educated at Colegio Cardenal Newman
21st-century Argentine politicians
Harvard Business School alumni
Argentine Roman Catholics